The Interim Government of Iran was the first government established in Iran after the Iranian Revolution. The regime was headed by Mehdi Bazargan, one of the members of the Freedom Movement of Iran, and formed on the order of Ruhollah Khomeini (known as the Ayatollah Khomeini) on 4 February 1979. From 4 to 11 February, Bazargan and Shapour Bakhtiar, the Shah's last Prime Minister, both claimed to be the legitimate prime minister; Bakhtiar fled on 11 February. Mehdi Bazargan was the prime minister of the interim government and introduced a seven-member cabinet on 14 February 1979. Ebrahim Yazdi was elected as the Foreign Minister.

The constitution of the Islamic Republic of Iran was adopted by referendum on 24 October 1979. Before it could come into force on 3 December 1979, however, the government resigned on 6 November soon after the taking over of the American embassy. The Council of the Islamic Revolution then served as the country's government until the formation of the first Islamic Consultative Assembly on 12 August 1980. Bazargan was elected to the first Islamic Consultative Assembly representing Tehran.

Formation of the interim government
When Ayatollah Khomeini, the leader of the Iranian revolution, came back to Iran after his 15-year exile, he appointed Mehdi Bazargan as the head of the interim government. On 4 February 1979, Ruhollah Khomeini issued a decree appointing Bazargan as the prime minister of "The Provisional Islamic Revolutionary Government" (PRG).

His decree stated:

Elaborating further on his decree, Khomeini made it clear that Iranians were commanded to obey Bazargan and that this was a religious duty.

As a man who, though the guardianship [Velayat] that I have from the holy lawgiver [the Prophet], I hereby pronounce Bazargan as the Ruler, and since I have appointed him, he must be obeyed. The nation must obey him. This is not an ordinary government. It is a government based on the sharia. Opposing this government means opposing the sharia of Islam ... Revolt against God's government is a revolt against God. Revolt against God is blasphemy.

Khomeini's announcement came days before the army's official statement announcing the army's (Bakhtiar's last hope) neutrality in conflicts between Khomeini's and Bakhtiar's supporters. Bakhtiar fled on the same day, 11 February, the day that is officially named as Islamic Revolution's Victory Day.

The PRG is often described as "subordinate" to the Revolutionary Council, and having had difficulties reigning in the numerous committees which were competing with its authority.

Members of the cabinet

According to Mohammad Ataie, the cabinet was made up of two main factions, moderates and radicals. Most of cabinet members were nationalist veterans and sympathizers of the Freedom Movement of Iran and a few from the National Front.

Bazargan reshuffled his cabinet several times because of resignation of ministers that were unable to cope with parallel sources of power. In several cases a ministry was supervised by an acting minister or Bazargan himself.

List of members of Bazargan's cabinet was as follows:

Resignation
The Prime Minister and all members of his cabinet resigned en masse on 6 November 1979 after American Embassy officials were taken hostage two days earlier on 4 November 1979. In his letter to Khomeini, Bazargan stated that "...repeated interferences, inconveniences, objections and disputes have made my colleagues and me unable to continue [meeting] our duties ...".

Power then passed into the hands of the Revolutionary Council. Bazargan had been a supporter of the original revolutionary draft constitution rather than theocracy by Islamic jurist, and his resignation was received by Khomeini without protest, saying "Mr. Bazargan ... was a little tired and preferred to stay on the sidelines for a while."  Khomeini later described his appointment of Bazargan as a "mistake". Bazargan, on the other hand, described the government as a "knife without blade."

See also

 Interim Government of Iran (1981)
 Iranian Revolution
 Iran hostage crisis

References

1979 establishments in Iran
1979 disestablishments in Iran
States and territories established in 1979
States and territories disestablished in 1979
Government of the Islamic Republic of Iran
Iranian Revolution
Provisional governments
Cabinets of Iran
Revolutionary organizations
Organisations of the Iranian Revolution
Ruhollah Khomeini
Revolutionary institutions of the Islamic Republic of Iran